Traccatichthys is a genus of stone loaches from southern China and Vietnam.

Species
There are currently four recognized species in this genus, although some authorities recognise fewer species, considering T, bacmmensis to be a synonym of T. taeniatus:
 Traccatichthys bacmeensis (Nguyen & Vo, 2005) 
 Traccatichthys pulcher (Nichols & C. H. Pope, 1927)
 Traccatichthys taeniatus (Pellegrin & Chevey, 1936)
 Traccatichthys tuberculum C. X. Du, E. Zhang & B. P. L. Chan, 2012

References

Nemacheilidae